Ethical codes are adopted by organizations to assist members in understanding the difference between right and wrong and in applying that understanding to their decisions. An ethical code generally implies documents at three levels: codes of business ethics, codes of conduct for employees, and codes of professional practice.

Code of ethics or code of conduct? (Corporate or business ethics)

Many organizations use the phrases ethical code and code of conduct interchangeably, but it may be useful to make a distinction. A code of ethics will start by setting out the values that underpin the code and will describe an organization's obligation to its stakeholders. The code is publicly available and addressed to anyone with an interest in that organization's activities and the way it operates. It will include details of how the organization plans to implement its values and vision, as well as guidance to staff on ethical standards and how to achieve them. However, a code of conduct is generally addressed to and intended for the organization's leaders and staff. It usually sets out restrictions on behavior, and will be far more focused on compliance or rules than on values or principles.

Code of practice (professional ethics)

A code of practice is adopted by a profession (or by a governmental or non-governmental organization) to regulate that profession. A code of practice may be styled as a code of professional responsibility, which will discuss difficult issues and difficult decisions that will often need to be made, and then provide a clear account of what behavior is considered "ethical" or "correct" or "right" in the circumstances. In a membership context, failure to comply with a code of practice can result in expulsion from the professional organization. In its 2007 International Good Practice Guidance, Defining and Developing an Effective Code of Conduct for Organizations, the International Federation of Accountants provided the following working definition:
"Principles, values, standards, or rules of behavior that guide the decisions, procedures and systems of an organization in a way that (a) contributes to the welfare of its key stakeholders, and (b) respects the rights of all constituents affected by its operations."

Listed below are a few example statements from the professional codes of the Public Relations Society of America (PRSA) and the Society of Professional Journalists (SPJ):

 PRSA Code of Ethics
 "Loyalty: We are faithful to those we represent, while honoring our obligation to serve the public interest."
 "Fairness: We deal fairly with clients, employers, competitors, peers, vendors, the media, and the general public. We respect all opinions and support the right of free expression."
 SPJ Code of Ethics
 "Minimize Harm … Balance the public’s need for information against potential harm or discomfort. Pursuit of the news is not a license for arrogance or undue intrusiveness. … Balance a suspect’s right to a fair trial with the public’s right to know. Consider the implications of identifying criminal suspects before they face legal charges. …"
 "Act Independently … Avoid conflicts of interest, real or perceived. Disclose unavoidable conflicts."

General notes
Ethical codes are often adopted by management and also employers, not to promote a particular moral theory, but rather because they are seen as pragmatic necessities for running an organization in a complex society in which moral concepts play an important part.

They are distinct from moral codes that may apply to the culture, education, and religion of a whole society. It is debated whether the politicians should apply a code of ethics, or whether it is a profession entirely discretionary, just subject to compliance with the law: however, recently codes of practice have been approved in this field.

Often, acts that violate ethical codes may also violate a law or regulation and can be punishable at law or by government agency remedies.

Even organizations and communities that may be considered criminal in nature may have ethical codes of conduct, official or unofficial. Examples could include hacker communities, bands of thieves, and street gangs.

Codes seek to define and delineate the difference between conduct and behavior that is malum in se, malum prohibitum, and good practice. Sometimes ethical codes include sections that are meant to give firm rules, but some offer general guidance, and sometimes the words are merely aspirational.

In sum, a code of ethics is an attempt to codify "good and bad behavior".

Examples

 Medical workers and physicians
 Code of Conduct for the International Red Cross and Red Crescent Movement and NGOs in Disaster Relief
 Declaration of Geneva
 Hippocratic Oath
 Percival's Medical Ethics
 Madrid Declaration on Ethical Standards for Psychiatric Practice
 Military, warfare, and other armed conflict
 Bushidō (Japanese samurai)
Chivalry
 Code of the U.S. Fighting Force
 International Code of Conduct against Ballistic Missile Proliferation ("ICOC" or "Hague Code of Conduct")
 Israel Defense Forces Code of Conduct
 Pirate code
 Uniform Code of Military Justice (United States)
 Warrior code
 Religious
 Code of Ma'at (Ancient Egypt)
 Eight Precepts (Buddhism)
 Five Precepts (Buddhism)
 Golden Rule / Ethic of reciprocity (various)
 Seven Laws of Noah (Judaism)
 Patimokkha (Buddhism)
 Quran (Islam)
 Rule of St. Benedict (Christian monasticism)
 Ten Commandments (Abrahamic religions)
 Ten Precepts (Buddhism)
 Ten Precepts (Taoism)
 Yamas and niyama (Hindu scriptures)
 Others
 American Library Association Code of Ethics
Applied ethics
 Media ethics
 Aviators Model Code of Conduct
 Global civics
 ICC Cricket Code of Conduct
 Institute of Internal Auditors, Code of Ethics
 Journalist's Creed
 Moral Code of the Builder of Communism

See also
 Medical ethics
 Public sector ethics

References

Sources

External links
 
 
 The Fourteen Principles of Ethical Conduct for Federal Employees
 The Code of Medical Ethics of the American Medical Association

 
Codes of conduct
Morality
Professional ethics